Elliott Charles Francis (born 16 August 1987) is a British actor.

Early life

Francis was brought up in North East England and started acting at a young age. He was a student of Stagecoach Theatre Arts for six years. Later he moved to London, where he won a full scholarship in 2004 to attend Redroofs Theatre School, graduating in 2006. In 2012, he graduated from Teesside University with a degree in Computer Animation.

Career

In 2011, Francis landed the role of Thorne in the Canadian children's game show Splatalot! and so did his sister Grace as Shaiden. He also spent three years playing the part of a Slytherin student on several Harry Potter films, and had a minor role in the Little Dorrit miniseries for the BBC. In 2015 he was nominated for a World Music & Independent Film Festival award for his performance in My Lonely Me as Sam.

Theatre
 The Merry Wives of Windsor, by Shakespeare as fairy (Royal Shakespeare Company)
 The Demon Headmaster Musical, by Mathew White as Charlie (-)
 East Meets West, by Sanjiv Bashir as Business Man (Tara Arts)

Filmography

Film

Television

Awards and nominations

References

External links
 

Living people
1987 births
English male film actors
English male television actors